The Icelandic Arctic Cooperation Network (IACN) is a non-governmental organization in Iceland creating stronger linkages through inclusive multi-stakeholder membership and network, for the facilitation of cooperation concerning the Arctic region.

The Icelandic government passed a "Governmental Policy Plan for the Economy and Community" called Iceland 20/20. The Icelandic Arctic Cooperation Network, established in 2013, is a part of the implementation process of this policy and the result of a collaboration between the members of the IACN; Eything - a regional body for cooperation between the municipalities in north-east Iceland; the Ministry for Foreign Affairs (Iceland), the Ministry of Education, Science and Culture (Iceland); and the Ministry for the Environment and Natural Resources (Iceland).

Recent additional members include the Centre for Gender Equality; the Fisheries Science Centre at the University of Akureyri; the Husavik Academic Centre; Arctic Services; the Icelandic Met Office; the Marine Research Institute; the Icelandic Maritime Administration; the University Centre of the Westfjords; and the Greenland Centre, also in the Westfjords of Iceland.

IACN's first director is Embla Eir Oddsdóttir.

The Icelandic Arctic Cooperation Network is one of four founders of the Icelandic-Arctic Chamber of Commerce. The other three are the Ministry for Foreign Affairs, Iceland; The Icelandic Chamber of Commerce; and the Federation of Icelandic Industries.

The network is based in the research centre Borgir, in Akureyri, Iceland.

References

Organizations based in Iceland
Arctic
Arctic research
2013 establishments in Iceland
Networks